The Ministry of Housing and Territorial Planning (acronym MVOT) is the Uruguayan government ministry which oversees the housing policies and territorial planning of Uruguay.

The current Minister of Housing and Territorial Planning is Irene Moreira, who has held the position since March 1, 2020.

Background 
It was created under the Civic-Military Dictatorship in 1974, with the name of the Ministry of Housing and Social Promotion; the ownership of this portfolio fell to Federico Soneira. This Ministry had a short life, being dissolved in 1977.

The current ministry was created on May 30, 1990, in the administration of Luis Alberto Lacalle. The prime minister responsible was Raúl Lago.

In 2020, during the government of Luis Lacalle Pou, it changes its denomination for Ministry of Housing and Territorial Planning, after the creation of a Ministry of Environment.

List of Ministers

See also
Cabinet of Uruguay
List of Ministers of Housing, Territorial Planning and Environment of Uruguay

References

External links

  Official website

Housing, Territorial Planning and Environment
Environment of Uruguay
Uruguay, Housing, Territorial Planning and Environment
Housing in Uruguay
Uruguay, Housing, Territorial Planning and Environment
Uruguay, Housing, Territorial Planning and Environment
1990 establishments in Uruguay